Constance Cummings CBE (May 15, 1910 – November 23, 2005) was an American-British actress with a career spanning over 50 years.

Early life 
Cummings was born in Seattle, Washington, the only daughter and younger child of Kate Logan (née Cummings), a concert soprano, and Dallas Vernon Halverstadt, a lawyer. 

Her mother was sister to Helen Cummings Bruce, whose daughter, Helen Bruce Baldwin, was the wife of famed 20th century journalist Hanson W. Baldwin. Cummings' parents separated when she was 10 years old, and she never saw her father again. She attended St. Nicholas Girls' School in Seattle.

Career 
The San Diego Stock Company gave Cummings her initial acting opportunity in a "walk-on part" playing a prostitute in a 1926 production of Seventh Heaven. She debuted on Broadway as a chorus girl, a member of the ensemble in Treasure Girl (1928) by the age of 18. While appearing on Broadway, she was discovered by Samuel Goldwyn, who brought her to Hollywood in 1931. Between 1931 and 1934, Cummings appeared in more than 20 films, including Movie Crazy opposite  Harold Lloyd, and American Madness, directed by Frank Capra.

Cummings was married to the playwright and screenwriter Benn Levy from July 3, 1933 until his death in 1973. As Levy was from the UK, Cummings moved there and continued acting in films and on the stage. Few of her films were hits in the U.S., but Blithe Spirit, adapted from the Noël Coward play, was popular. Levy wrote and directed films for Cummings, such as The Jealous God (1939); he also served in the UK Parliament from 1945 to 1950 as the Labour MP for Eton and Slough. They had a son and a daughter. She played Mary Tyrone in the Royal National Theatre's production of Eugene O'Neill's Long Day's Journey into Night opposite Laurence Olivier and later recreated the role for television. She also originated the role of Martha in Edward Albee's Who's Afraid of Virginia Woolf in its London debut.

Recognition 
In 1979, Cummings won the Tony Award for Best Actress in a Play for her performance as Emily Stilson in the drama Wings (1978–1979) (written by Arthur Kopit), a play about a former aviator (Stilson) who has suffered a stroke, from which she struggles to recover. This role also brought her Obie and Drama Desk awards and an Olivier nomination. In 1982, she was nominated for a Drama Desk Award for Outstanding Actress in a Play for her work in The Chalk Garden.

She received an Evening Standard Best Actress Award for her performance in Long Day's Journey into Night.

On January 1, 1974, Cummings, who resided in Britain for many decades until her death, was made a Commander of the Order of the British Empire (CBE) for her contributions to the British entertainment industry. 

She was a committee member of the Royal Court Theatre and the Arts Council. She has a star in the Motion Pictures section on the Hollywood Walk of Fame at 6201 Hollywood Boulevard. It was dedicated on February 8, 1960.

Death 
Constance Cummings Levy died in Wardington, Oxfordshire, England on November 23, 2005, aged 95, from natural causes.

Filmography 

 The Criminal Code (1931) as Mary Brady
 The Last Parade (1931) as Molly Pearson
 Lover Come Back (1931) as Connie Lee
 Traveling Husbands (1931) as Ellen Wilson
 The Guilty Generation (1931) as Maria Palmero
 Behind the Mask (1932) as Julie Arnold
 The Big Timer (1932) as Honey Baldwin
 Attorney for the Defense (1932) as Ruth Barry
 American Madness (1932) as Helen
 Movie Crazy (1932) as Mary Sears
 The Last Man (1932) as Marian
 Washington Merry-Go-Round (1932) as Alice
 Night After Night (1932) as Miss Jerry Healy
 The Billion Dollar Scandal (1933) as Doris Masterson
 The Mind Reader (1933) as Sylvia
 Heads We Go (1933) as Betty Smith / Dorothy Kay
 Channel Crossing (1933) as Marion Slade
 Broadway Through a Keyhole (1933) as Joan Whelan
 Looking for Trouble (1934) as Ethel Greenwood
 Glamour (1934) as Linda Fayne
 This Man Is Mine (1934) as Francesca Harper
 Remember Last Night? (1935) as Carlotta Milburn
 Seven Sinners (1936) as Caryl Fenton
 Strangers on Honeymoon (1936) as October
 Cyrano de Bergerac (1938, TV movie) as Roxane
 Busman's Honeymoon (1940) as Harriet Vane
 This England (1941) as Ann
 The Foreman Went to France (1942) as Anne Stafford, the American girl
 Blithe Spirit (1945) as Ruth Condomine
 Into the Blue (1950) as Mrs. Kate Fergusson
 Trial and Error (1953, TV movie) as Andrea
 John and Julie (1955) as Mrs. Davidson
 The Intimate Stranger (1956) as Kay Wallace
 The Trial of Mary Dugan (1957, TV movie) as Mary Dugan, known as Mona Tree
 Craig's Wife (1957, TV movie) as Harriet Craig
 The Battle of the Sexes (1960) as Angela Barrows
 Sammy Going South (1963) as Gloria van Imhoff
 In the Cool of the Day (1963) as Mrs. Nina Gellert
 Love Song (1985, TV movie) as Dame Philippa Hatchard
 Dead Man's Folly (1986, TV movie) as Amy Folliat
 The Understanding (1986, TV movie) as Acton (final film role)

Theatre

References

External links 
 
 
 

1910 births
2005 deaths
20th-century American actresses
20th-century English actresses
Actresses from Seattle
American film actresses
American stage actresses
American television actresses
American emigrants to the United Kingdom
Commanders of the Order of the British Empire
Drama Desk Award winners
English film actresses
English stage actresses
English television actresses
Tony Award winners
Naturalised citizens of the United Kingdom
WAMPAS Baby Stars
20th-century British businesspeople
21st-century American women